Markéta Pekarová Adamová (born 2 October 1984) is a Czech politician who is the Speaker of the Chamber of Deputies since 2021 and leader of TOP 09 since 2019.

She graduated with a bachelor's degree from the Faculty of Arts, Charles University in Prague in 2008, and an engineer title from the Czech Technical University in Prague in 2011. She has been a member of the Chamber of Deputies since 2013. She defeated Tomáš Czernin in a TOP 09 leadership election on 24 November 2019, with 53% of the votes.

During the parliamentary elections campaigne she was one of three leaders of the three-party Spolu coalition, along with Petr Fiala (ODS) and Marian Jurečka (KDU-ČSL). 

On 10 November 2021 she was elected President of the Chamber of Deputies of the Czech Republic. She gained 102 from 122 votes, surpassing the 98 required. On 20 November 2021, Pekarová Adamová was reelected in a TOP 09 leadership election as the only candidate, with 163 of 176 votes.

References

External links
Profile on the website of TOP 09
Profile on the website of Parliament

1984 births
Living people
21st-century Czech women politicians
TOP 09 MPs
People from Litomyšl
Charles University alumni
Members of the Chamber of Deputies of the Czech Republic (2017–2021)
Members of the Chamber of Deputies of the Czech Republic (2013–2017)
Leaders of TOP 09
Members of the Chamber of Deputies of the Czech Republic (2021–2025)
Speakers of the Chamber of Deputies (Czech Republic)
Women legislative speakers
Czech Technical University in Prague alumni